Giuseppe "Joe the Boss" Masseria (January 17, 1886April 15, 1931) was an early Italian-American Mafia boss in New York City. He was boss of what is now called the Genovese crime family, one of the New York City Mafia's Five Families, from 1922 to 1931. In 1930, he battled in the Castellammarese War to take over the criminal activities in New York City. The war ended with his murder on April 15, 1931, in a hit ordered by his own lieutenant, Charles "Lucky" Luciano, in an agreement with rival faction head Salvatore Maranzano.

Early life
Giuseppe Masseria was born on January 17, 1886, in Menfi, Province of Agrigento, Sicily, in a family of tailors. When he was young, he moved to the town of Marsala, in the Province of Trapani. Masseria arrived in the United States in 1902. He then became part of the Morello crime family based in Harlem and parts of Little Italy in southern Manhattan. Masseria was a contemporary of other captains of that mafia family such as Gaetano Reina. In 1909, Masseria was convicted of burglary and received a suspended sentence. On May 23, 1913, Masseria was sentenced to four to six years in prison for third-degree burglary.

As the 1910s ended, Masseria and boss Salvatore D'Aquila vied for power in New York. By the early 1920s, they were at war with each other. In 1920, Masseria had recruited Lucky Luciano as one of his gunmen. D'Aquila also had a gunman working for him, Umberto Valenti, and ordered him to kill Masseria. On May 7, 1922, the boss of the Morello/Terranova crime family, Vincenzo Terranova, was killed in a drive-by shooting near his E. 116th Street home. Valenti was believed to have been personally responsible. Hours later, Terranova's underboss Silva Tagliagamba was fatally wounded in Lower Manhattan by Valenti and gunmen working for him. The next day, Valenti and some of his men attacked the new boss of the rival Terranova family, Masseria. Valenti found Masseria and his bodyguards on Grand Street "within a block of Police Headquarters". Masseria got away, but the gunmen had shot four men and two women; Masseria tossed his pistol away and was arrested while fleeing the scene.

On August 9, 1922, Masseria walked out of his apartment at 80 2nd Avenue, and was rushed by two armed men who opened fire on him. Masseria ducked into a store at 82 2nd Avenue with the gunmen in pursuit. They shot out the front window and shot up the inside of the store. The gunmen fled across 2nd Avenue to a getaway car idling just around the corner on E. 5th Street. The car was a Hudson Cruiser. The gunmen jumped on the running boards as the car sped west on E. 5th Street towards the Bowery, guns blazing. The gunmen then plowed through a crowd and shot randomly at the blockade, wounding six men. Masseria survived the incident and was found by police in his upstairs bedroom shell-shocked. He was sitting on his bed dazed, with two bullet holes through his straw hat, which he was still wearing. The incident gained Masseria new respect among gangsters as "the man who can dodge bullets" and his reputation began to rise as D'Aquila's began to wane. 

Forty-eight hours later, on August 11, Valenti attended a meeting in a cafe at the corner of Second Avenue and E. 12th Street, where he was murdered as he tried to flee.

Castellammarese War
Masseria became head of the Morello family and was known as "Joe the Boss", with Giuseppe Morello as his consigliere.

Salvatore D'Aquila was killed on October 10, 1928. Masseria, the leader of a gang that emerged from the old Morello crime family, was selected to replace D'Aquila as the new capo dei capi that winter. After his elevation, Masseria began applying pressure to other mafia gangs for monetary tributes. Other mobsters accused him of orchestrating the 1930 murders of Gaspar Milazzo in Detroit and Gaetano Reina in the Bronx. Nicolo Schiro tried to replicate the strategy of neutrality he used to deal with D'Aquila with Masseria but he was vigorously opposed by Salvatore Maranzano and Buffalo boss Stefano Magaddino. Masseria claimed Schiro had committed a transgression and demanded Schiro pay him $10,000 and step down as leader of his mafia crime family. Schiro complied. Soon after, Vito Bonventre was murdered at his home on July 15, 1930. This led to Maranzano being elevated to boss of the gang and a conflict with Masseria and his allies referred to as the Castellammarese War.

During the Castellammarese War, between 1930 and 1931, Masseria and Morello fought against a rival group, based in Brooklyn, led by Salvatore Maranzano and Joseph Bonanno. Morello, an old hand in the killing game, became Masseria's "war chief" and strategic adviser.

One of the first victims of the war, Morello was killed along with associate Joseph Perriano on August 15, 1930, while collecting cash receipts in his East Harlem office. Joseph Valachi, the first made man in the American Mafia to turn state's evidence, identified Morello's killer as a Castellammarese gunman he knew as "Buster from Chicago".

Death
In a secret deal with Maranzano, Lucky Luciano agreed to engineer the death of his boss, Masseria, in return for receiving Masseria's rackets and becoming Maranzano's second-in-command. Joe Adonis had joined the Masseria faction and when Masseria heard about Luciano's betrayal, he approached Adonis about killing Luciano. However, Adonis instead warned Luciano about the murder plot. On April 15, 1931, Luciano  lured Masseria to a meeting where he was murdered at a restaurant called Nuova Villa Tammaro on Coney Island. While they played cards, Luciano allegedly excused himself to the bathroom, with the gunmen reportedly being Albert Anastasia, Vito Genovese, Joe Adonis, and Benjamin "Bugsy" Siegel; Ciro "The Artichoke King" Terranova drove the getaway car, but legend has it that he was too shaken up to drive away and had to be shoved out of the driver's seat by Siegel.

Luciano was brought in for questioning by the police. At the time, police suspected a gangster named John "Silk Stockings" Giustra as being one of the gunmen in Masseria's murder. This was based on the report of a confidential informant and that one of the coats found at the murder scene was identified as belonging to Giustra. The case was dropped after Giustra was murdered on July 9, 1931.

According to The New York Times, "[A]fter that, the police have been unable to learn definitely [what happened]". Reputedly Masseria was "seated at a table playing cards with two or three unknown men"  when he was fired upon from behind. He died from gunshot wounds to his head, back, and chest. Masseria's autopsy report shows that he died on an empty stomach. No witnesses came forward, though "two or three" men were observed leaving the restaurant and getting into a stolen car. No one was convicted in Masseria's murder as there were no witnesses and Luciano had an alibi.

Masseria is buried at Calvary Cemetery in Queens, New York.

In popular culture

Films
The Valachi Papers (1972) – portrayed by Alessandro Sperlì
Mobsters (1991) – portrayed by Anthony Quinn
Lansky (1999) – portrayed by Bill Capizzi
Bonanno: A Godfather’s Story (1999) – portrayed by Tony Calabretta

TV series
Boardwalk Empire (2010–2014) – portrayed by Ivo Nandi. His assassination is depicted as being carried out by Benny Siegel and Tonino Sandrelli.
The Making of the Mob: New York (2015) – In this docu-drama he is portrayed by Stelio Savante
The Gangster Chronicles (1981) – in the NBC American crime drama miniseries, he is portrayed by Richard S. Castellano

See also

Black Hand (extortion)
Crime in New York City

References

Further reading
Bernstein, Lee. The Greatest Menace: Organized Crime in Cold War America. Boston: UMass Press, 2002. 
Bonanno, Joseph. A Man of Honor: The Autobiography of Joseph Bonanno. New York: St. Martin's Press, 2003. 
Capeci, Jerry. The Complete Idiot's Guide to the Mafia. Indianapolis: Alpha Books, 2002. 
Critchley, David. The Origin of Organized Crime: The New York City Mafia, 1891-1931. New York, Routledge, 2008.
Dash, Mike. The First Family: Terror, Extortion and the Birth of the American Mafia. London, Simon & Schuster, 2009.
Davis, John H. Mafia Dynasty: The Rise and Fall of the Gambino Crime Family. New York: HarperCollins, 1993. 
Hortis, C. Alexander The Mob and the City: The Hidden History of How the Mafia Captured New York. Amherst, New York: Prometheus Books, 2014
Kobler, John. Capone: The Life and Times of Al Capone. New York: Da Capo Press, 2003. 
Mannion, James. 101 Things You Didn't Know About The Mafia: The Lowdown on Dons, Wiseguys, Squealers and Backstabbers. Avon, Massachusetts: Adams Media, 2005. 
Messick, Hank. Lansky. London: Robert Hale & Company, 1973. 
Milhorn, H. Thomas. Crime: Computer Viruses to Twin Towers. Boca Raton, Florida: Universal Publishers, 2005. 
Peterson, Robert W. Crime & the American Response. New York: Facts on File, 1973. 
Ferrara, Eric. Gangsters, Murderers & Weirdos of the Lower East Side; A self-guided walking tour 2008
Volkman, Ernest Gangbusters: The Destruction of America's Last Great Mafia Dynasty. New York: Harper Collins, 1998.
 

1886 births
1931 deaths
1931 murders in the United States
People from Menfi
Italian emigrants to the United States
Prohibition-era gangsters
Capo dei capi
Bosses of the Genovese crime family
Murdered American gangsters of Sicilian descent
Gangsters killed during the Castellammarese War
People murdered by the Genovese crime family
Deaths by firearm in Brooklyn
People murdered in New York City
Male murder victims
Burials at Calvary Cemetery (Queens)
American shooting survivors